Major William Bain Gray, CBE (1886 – 3 February 1949) was a British colonial administrator and civil servant. He studied history at the University of Edinburgh and was awarded a PhD in 1921 for his thesis, “The military forces and the public revenue of Scotland, 1660-1688”. He was Governor of St Helena from 1941 to 1946.

References

External links
https://www.ukwhoswho.com/view/10.1093/ww/9780199540891.001.0001/ww-9780199540884-e-226104

1886 births
1949 deaths
20th-century British civil servants
British people in Saint Helena, Ascension and Tristan da Cunha